Libertador General San Martín is a Department of San Luis Province, Argentina.

With an area of  it borders to the north with the Department of Junín, to the east with Chacabuco, to the south with Coronel Pringles and to the west with Ayacucho.

Municipalities 
 Las Aguadas
 Las Chacras
 Las Lagunas
 Las Vertientes
 Paso Grande
 San Martín
 Villa de Praga

Villages 
 Alsa
 Bajo de Veliz
 Barrancos Altos
 Buena Vista
 Cabeza de Novillo
 Cañada Quemada
 Cerros Largos
 El Arenal
 El Divisadero
 El Estanquito
 El Rincón
 El Valle
 Intihuasi
 La Ciénaga
 La Cocha
 La Huerta
 La Ramada
 La Tolora
 Las Lagunas
 Los Comederos
 Manantial
 Mesilla del Cura
 9 de julio
 Piedras Anchas
 Potrerillo
 Puerta Colorada
 Quebrada de San Vicente
 Rincón del Carmen
 Rodeo Viejo
 San Antonio
 San Isidro
 San Rafael
 Tala Verde

Departments of San Luis Province